Mihály Kata (born 13 April 2002) is a Hungarian footballer who currently plays as a midfielder for MTK.

Career statistics

References

2002 births
Living people
Hungarian footballers
Hungary youth international footballers
Hungary under-21 international footballers
Association football midfielders
MTK Budapest FC players
Nemzeti Bajnokság I players
Footballers from Budapest